
Totesee (Germanized: Totensee) is a small natural lake at the Grimsel Pass in Switzerland. The lake lies immediately to the south of the natural watershed and cantonal boundary at the pass. It is therefore in the canton of Valais, and it would naturally drain into the river Rhône in the valley below. As part of this work, an aqueduct supplies water to the Grimselsee, which drains into the river Aare and thus forms part of the Rhine catchment.

In November 2006, the lake's entire trout population died, possibly due to algae.

The name Totensee (also: Lake Toten, literally "Lake of the Dead") is said to be derived from soldiers of Duke Berchtold V of Zähringen driven into the lake by the people of Valais after the Battle of Ulrichen in 1211.

See also
List of mountain lakes of Switzerland

References

External links

Lakes of Valais
Reservoirs in Switzerland
LTotensee